The Lincolnshire Poacher was a powerful British shortwave numbers station that transmitted from Her Majesty’s Government Communications Centre in Gawcott near Buckinghamshire, England, and later Cyprus, from the mid-1960s to June 2008. The station gained its commonly known name as it uses bars from the English folk song "The Lincolnshire Poacher" as an interval signal. The radio station was believed to be operated by the British Secret Intelligence Service. Amateur direction finding linked it with the Royal Air Force base at Akrotiri, Cyprus, where several curtain antennas had been identified as being its transmitter. It consisted of a pre recorded English-accented female voice reading groups of five numbers: e.g., '0-2-5-8-8'. The final number in each group was spoken at a higher pitch. It is likely that the station was used to communicate to undercover agents operating in other countries, to be decoded using a one-time pad.

An Asian numbers station of identical format is believed to have been broadcast from Australia, and nicknamed "Cherry Ripe". It uses several bars from the English folk song of the same name as its interval signal. Cherry Ripe ceased broadcasting in December 2009.

History 
The precise date that the Lincolnshire Poacher began broadcasting is not known for certain; however, it is believed that the broadcasts started around the early to mid 1970s. While numbers stations have existed since World War I, numbers stations such as Lincolnshire Poacher began appearing during the Cold War era, when nations such as the Soviet Union and the United Kingdom needed to send messages discreetly to their operatives in other countries. However, after the Cold War, the number of numbers stations greatly decreased. The Lincolnshire Poacher remained operating after the end of the Cold War, and continued to be broadcast into the next two decades.

The Lincolnshire Poacher ceased broadcasting in July 2008; the final station transmission to be recorded occurred on 29 June 2008. It is believed that the station's sister station, Cherry Ripe, began to send broadcasts that used to be intended to be sent over the Lincolnshire Poacher station. This is believed to be true because the "Cherry Ripe" station used a very similar call signal, and broadcast its messages in 200 sets of five-number IDs.

The Lincolnshire Poacher numbers station features prominently in the BBC The Lovecraft Investigations podcast episode "The Whisperer in Darkness", and also in the Amazon Prime series Truth Seekers.

Location 
Although the usage of numbers stations has not been confirmed by any world government, amateur enthusiasts have traced the location of the Lincolnshire Poacher's signal transmission to RAF Akrotiri, a Royal Air Force base located on the Mediterranean island of Cyprus. The station is believed to have been operated by the British Secret Intelligence Service (MI6) and maintained by the Royal Air Force members that occupy the base in Cyprus.

Broadcast schedule
The Lincolnshire Poacher was broadcast several times throughout the day, and was transmitted seven days a week, at various times and on various shortwave frequencies. This schedule was accurate as of January 2006, which is the most recent update to the broadcast schedule. All times are Coordinated Universal Time (UTC), and all radio frequencies in megahertz (MHz).

References

Footnotes

Secret broadcasting
Radio in Cyprus
1960s establishments in Cyprus
2008 disestablishments in Cyprus
Secret Intelligence Service
Radio stations disestablished in 2008
Numbers stations